Aicha Sidibe (born 3 December 1995) is a Senegalese center basketball player for the Senegalese national team. 

She participated at the 2017 Women's Afrobasket.

References

External links

1995 births
Living people
Senegalese women's basketball players
Centers (basketball)